Juan Bautista Viacava Caviglia (born 20 February 1999) is an Uruguayan professional footballer who plays as a midfielder for Spanish club Racing de Ferrol.

References

External links 

1999 births
Living people
Uruguayan footballers
Uruguayan expatriate footballers
People from Montevideo
Footballers from Montevideo
Association football midfielders
Uruguayan Primera División players
Segunda División B players
Centro Atlético Fénix players
Rampla Juniors players
Miramar Misiones players
Racing de Ferrol footballers
Uruguayan expatriate sportspeople in Spain
Expatriate footballers in Spain